Undervud (Russian spelling of Underwood) is a Russian and Ukrainian musical group (alternative rock,
indie rock style) established by Maksim Kucherenko (Максим Кучеренко) and Vladimir Tkachenko (Владимир Ткаченко), two medical students from the Crimea. They have released 8 albums, the last one in September 2015.

The soundtracks of
the group have been used in several films, cartoons and theatrical performances.

The band's songs are present in the charts of radio stations in Russia and other post-Soviet
countries and are also aired by some overseas stations (Israel, United States).
Their albums occupy the top places in the final year charts. Undervud is the
winner of several musical nominations, among them the Russian “Baker’s dozen”
(“Best Album”), “Steppenwolf” (“Best Lyrics” and “Best Song”), Rock Alternative
Music Prize and “Song of the Year” (“The most beautiful girl in the world”),
according to the radio station Jam FM. Undervud has always been loved by journalists,
editors, writers and poets. Undervud is the winner of the International
Voloshin Prize “for aesthetics in contemporary music and poetic lyrics”. It is
the first musical group to receive such a high praise from the literary
community.

Discography 
 Vse proydet, milaya (Everything Will Pass by, Darling), 2002
 Krasnaya Knopka (Red Button), 2003
 Bablo pobezhdaet zlo (Money Conquers the Evil), 2005
 Opium dlya naroda (Opium of the People), 2007
 Vse, kogo ty tak sil'no lyubil (Everyone That You Used to Love So Much), 2008
 Babl-gam (Bubble Gum), 2011
 Zhenshiny i Deti (Women & kids), 2013
 Bez Beeregov (Without shore), 2015
 Dieti Potveina (Port Wine Kids), 2019

External links
 http://www.undervud.ru/ Official site

Russian rock music groups